Peter Garland Glover (January 14, 1792 – October 27, 1851) was a U.S. politician from Missouri.

He was born in Buckingham County, Virginia, and later moved with his family to Callaway County, Missouri. From 1830 to 1832, he served as a county judge. In 1832, he was elected to the Missouri General Assembly. From 1835 to 1837, he served as State Auditor. From 1837 to 1839, he served as Secretary of State. He also served the state government as Register of Lands and School Commissioner. From 1843 until his death in Osage County, Missouri, he served as State Treasurer of Missouri.

References
 Missouri State Treasurer Scott Fitzpatrick-Past Treasurer's Biography

1792 births
1851 deaths
State Auditors of Missouri
Secretaries of State of Missouri
State treasurers of Missouri
Missouri Democrats
People from Buckingham County, Virginia
People from Callaway County, Missouri
19th-century American politicians